Thomas Oldham (4 May 1816, Dublin – 17 July 1878, Rugby) was an Anglo-Irish geologist.

He was educated at Trinity College, Dublin and studied civil engineering at the University of Edinburgh as well as geology under Robert Jameson.

In 1838 he joined the ordnance survey in Ireland as a chief assistant under Joseph Ellison Portlock who was studying the geology of Londonderry and neighbourhood. Portlock wrote of him 

He discovered radiating fans shaped impressions in the town of Bray in 1840. He showed this to the English palaeontologist Edward Forbes, who named it Oldhamia after him. Forbes declared them to be bryozoans, however later workers ascribed it to other plants and animals. For a while these were considered the oldest fossils in the world.

He became Curator to the Geological Society of Dublin, and in 1845 succeeded John Phillips, nephew of William Smith, in the Chair of Geology at Trinity College, Dublin. He was elected a Fellow of the Royal Society in June 1848.

He married Louisa Matilda Dixon of Liverpool in 1850. He resigned in November that year and took a position as the first Superintendent of the Geological Survey of India. He was to be the first of the Irish geologists to migrate to the Subcontinent. He was followed by his brother Charles, William King Jr., son of William King the Professor of Geology at Queen's College, Galway; Valentine Ball and more than 12 other Irish geologists.

In India he oversaw a mapping program that focussed on coal bearing strata. The team of geologists made major discoveries. Henry Benedict Medlicott coined the term "Gondwana Series" in 1872. Oldham's elder son Richard Dixon Oldham distinguished three types of pressure produced by earthquakes: now known as P (compressional), S (shear), and L (Love)-waves, based on his observations made after the Great Assam Earthquake of 1897. Richard showed in 1906 the arrival patterns of waves and suggested that the core of the earth was liquid. His younger son Henry became a reader in geography at King's College, Cambridge.

He also started the Paleontologia Indica, a series of memoirs on the fossils of India. For this work he recruited Ferdinand Stoliczka from Europe.

Oldham resigned from his position in India in 1876 on the grounds of poor health and retired to Rugby in England. In recognition of his lifetime's "long & important services in the science of geology", including Palaeontographica Indica, he was awarded the Royal Society's Royal Medal. He died on 17 July 1878.

References

1816 births
1878 deaths
British geologists
Royal Medal winners
Alumni of Trinity College Dublin
Alumni of the University of Edinburgh
Fellows of the Royal Society
Presidents of The Asiatic Society